Johann Borenstein is an Israeli roboticist and Professor at the University of Michigan. Borenstein is well known for his work in autonomous obstacle avoidance, and is credited with the development of the Vector Field Histogram.

Borenstein received his B.Sc., M.Sc., and D.Sc. degrees in mechanical engineering from the Technion in 1981, 1983, and 1987, respectively.

References

External links
 Home page

Living people
Year of birth missing (living people)
Israeli roboticists
University of Michigan faculty